Petruška or Petruska is a surname.  Notable people with the surname include:

András Petruska (born 1986), Hungarian singer
Patrik Petruška (born 1991), Czech ice hockey player
Richard Petruška (born 1969), Slovak-Italian basketball player

See also
Petrushka
Petrushka (disambiguation)